Cee Cee Michaela (born May 1, 1970) is a television and Broadway actress. She appeared as Yvonne in the television show Girlfriends. She is also the creator of Zuleana, advertised as a health and wellness product.

Filmography

Film

Television

References

External links 

 

Living people
American actresses
1970 births
21st-century American women